Phaius robertsii, commonly known as forest swamp orchid, is a plant in the orchid family and is native to a small area of Tropical North Queensland and to New Caledonia. It is an evergreen, terrestrial herb with above-ground stems, three to five pleated leaves and up to twenty flowers which are yellow on the back and brick-red inside. It grows in wet places in rainforest.

Description
The flowers are yellow on the back and brick-red inside. The lateral sepals are a similar length but slightly wider and spread apart from each other. The petals are a similar length to the sepals but narrower and curve forwards. There is a complex callus in the centre of the labellum. Flowering occurs from April to June.

Taxonomy and naming
Phaius robertsii was first formally described in 1883 by Ferdinand von Mueller in Southern Science Record. The species was discovered by Edgar Leopold Layard and "came under the horticultural care of Mr. James Roberts, F.R.H.S., in whose conservatory and under whose skillful attention it has lately been blooming here."

Phaius pictus was first formally described in 1952 by Trevor Edgar Hunt in The Victorian Naturalist from a specimen collected on Mount Bellenden Ker. The specific epithet (pictus) is a Latin word meaning "painted" or "coloured".

In 2017, Judi Stone and Phillip James Cribb published a monograph entitled Lady Tankerville's Legacy  – A Historical and Monographic Review of Phaius and Gastrorchis and reduced Phaius pictus to a synonym of Phaius robertsii. However, the accepted name for this species according to the Council of Heads of Australasian Herbaria is  P. pictus.

Distribution and habitat
It also occurs on the main island of New Caledonia. It prefers humid, sheltered rainforest close to streams or areas of seepage, or among boulders and forest litter.

Conservation status
This species is listed as "vulnerable" by the Australian Commonwealth EPBC Act (under  Phaius pictus, the name accepted by the Council of Heads of Australasian Herbaria) and under the Queensland Government Nature Conservation Act 1992.

References

Plants described in 1883
Orchids of Queensland
Endemic orchids of Australia
Terrestrial orchids
robertsii